Urulikunnam is a small village near Paika Town in the Meenachil Taluka area of Kottayam District, Kerala, India. It consists of many religious communities.
 Most of the people are farmers.  There is a parish church and temples.  Njandupara and Chengalam are the nearest places.

References 

Villages in Kottayam district